Burton is an unincorporated community in King County, Washington.  It is a historic waterfront residential area on Vashon Island. The town of Burton sits at the isthmus between Inner and Outer Quartermaster Harbor. The town was named in 1892 by Mrs. Miles Hatch after her home town in Illinois, and in that year development began in Burton with the Vashon College and the Burton Store. Industries around Burton at that time included logging, shingle manufacturing and brickmaking.

References

External links

 Camp Burton, in Burton, King County, Washington

Unincorporated communities in King County, Washington
Unincorporated communities in Washington (state)